Diegomar Raymundo "Diego" Markwell (born August 8, 1980 in Willemstad, Curaçao, Netherlands Antilles) is a Dutch baseball player for Curaçao Neptunus of the Honkbal Hoofdklasse.

Markwell represented the Netherlands at the 2004 Summer Olympics in Athens, where he and his team finished sixth. Markwell was also named to the Dutch roster for the 2005 European Baseball Championship, 2006 World Baseball Classic, 2006 Intercontinental Cup, 2007 European Baseball Championship, 2008 Summer Olympics, 2009 World Baseball Classic, 2010 European Baseball Championship, 2010 Intercontinental Cup, 2011 Baseball World Cup, 2013 World Baseball Classic, 2013 World Port Tournament, 2014 European Baseball Championship, 2015 World Port Tournament, 2015 WBSC Premier12, 2016 Haarlem Baseball Week, and the 2016 European Baseball Championship. He played for Team Netherlands in the 2019 European Baseball Championship, and at the Africa/Europe 2020 Olympic Qualification tournament in Italy in September 2019.

References

External links

Markwell at the Dutch Olympic Archive

1980 births
2006 World Baseball Classic players
2009 World Baseball Classic players
2013 World Baseball Classic players
2015 WBSC Premier12 players
2016 European Baseball Championship players
2017 World Baseball Classic players
2019 European Baseball Championship players

Baseball players at the 2004 Summer Olympics
Baseball players at the 2008 Summer Olympics
Charleston AlleyCats players
Curaçao baseball players
Curaçao expatriate baseball players in Taiwan
Curaçao expatriate baseball players in the United States
Curacao Neptunus players
DOOR Neptunus players
Dunedin Blue Jays players
Hagerstown Suns players
Leones del Caracas players
Living people
New Haven Ravens players
Olympic baseball players of the Netherlands
Dutch baseball players
People from Willemstad
Queens Kings players
St. Catharines Stompers players
Tennessee Smokies players
Curaçao expatriate baseball players in Venezuela